Robert Buchanan (1802–1875) was a Scottish minister and historian who served as Moderator of the General Assembly to the Free Church of Scotland in 1860/61. He was one of the leading figures in the Disruption of 1843.

He had correspondence with several notable figures of the day over many years: Lord Aberdeen; Sir Robert Peel; Thomas Chalmers from 1834 to 1845; and George Combe from 1821 to 1827.

Life
He was born in July 1802 at St Ninian's, a small district in the east of Stirling in central Scotland. He was the son of Alexander Buchanan, a brewer and farmer, and his wife, Margaret Wingate. He studied Divinity at Glasgow University. He was ordained in the Church of Scotland in 1826 in Gargunnock and translated in 1829 to Saltoun in East Lothian, replacing Rev Dr Gilbert Burnet.
In 1833 he moved to the Tron Kirk in Glasgow. He then lived at 2 Richmond Street.

Working from the base created by his predecessor, Rev Dr Thomas Chalmers he did much "home mission" work in Glasgow and expanded the church into the poorer areas such as "The Wynds" of old Glasgow. .

In 1838 it was Buchanan who chaired the debate on the "Auchterarder question", regarding the ability of a congregation to refuse a minister proposed by the local patron. This debate was the beginning of the schism which eventually led to the Disruption of 1843. In this. Buchanan stood at the side of Chalmers and was part of the heated debate. The church split in two and he was thereafter a minister of the Free Church of Scotland.

In 1857 he transferred to the Free College Church College on Lynedoch Street.

In 1860 he succeeded Very Rev William Cunningham as Moderator of the General Assembly, the highest position in the Free Church. He was succeeded in turn in 1861 by Rev Robert Smith Candlish.

From 1863 to 1873 he presided over the committee looking at the potential union of the Free Church with the United Presbyterian Church, the Reformed Presbyterian Church and the Presbyterian Church of England, all being doctrinally similar. Although these talks were unsuccessful, large sections did merge in 1900. From 1872 until death he was an active member of the Glasgow School Board.

In later life he lived at 2 Sandyford Place, a handsome Georgian terraced house in north-west Glasgow.
 
He was invited to speak at the Scottish Church in Rome, Italy in February 1875. He fell ill during this trip and died in Rome during the night of 30/31 March 1875. His body was returned to Glasgow for burial.

Publications
Speech in General Assembly  (Glasgow,  1838)
God to be  obeyed rather than Man, a discourse (Glasgow, 1839)
The  Presbyteries  of  the  Church threatened with Imprisonment in the discharge of their Official Duty (Glasgow, 1839)
A Discourse after the Funeral of Mrs Alexander of Ballochmyle (Glasgow, 1843)
A Discourse after the Funeral of Claud Alexander of Ballochmyle (Glasgow, 1845)
The Ten Years' Conflict, 2  vols. (Edinburgh,  1849)
The Schoolmaster in the  Wynds, or how to Educate the Masses (Glasgow,  1850)
Notes of a Clerical Furlough (London,  1859)
The Book of Ecclesiastes (London, 1859)
Present State of the  Union Question (Edinburgh)
Lectures I. (To  Young  Men)
IV. (On the Evidences)
V. (On the Jews)
Sermon  XLIX.  (Free Church  Pulpit).

Artistic recognition

He was photographed when he was Moderator in 1860 (illustrated right) at the foot of the steps to New College with several ex-Moderators of the Free Church.

He was portrayed by James Armytage.

Family
He  married:
(1) 5  March  1828,  Anne  Handyside,  died  29 April  1841,  and  had  issue— 
Alexander,  C.E., Derby,  born  10  December  1829
Hugh,  born 22  October  1831
Margaret,  born  10 March  1833,  died  5th  March  1834
Marjory, born  8  April  1835,  died  2  April  1837
Anne  Wingate,  born  28  July  1837
Robert, born  28  August  1838,  died  11th  July  1841
(2)  31  October  1843,  Elizabeth  (died  28 April  1898),  daughter  of  Laurence  Stoddart, Cambridge, and had issue —
Isabella  (married John  M'Laren)
Charlotte  Elizabeth  (married Robert  M'Alpine  Thornton,  minister  of  Wellpark  Free  Church)
Harriet  (married  Dr J.  G.  Wilson)
Laurence,  solicitor,  Glasgow.

References
Citations

Sources

Further reading

1802 births
1875 deaths
People from Stirling
19th-century Ministers of the Church of Scotland